Reunion Dinner (Chinese: 团圆饭) is a 2022 Singaporean Mandarin-language Chinese New Year comedy drama film. It tells the story of a soon-to-be-married couple who arrange for their parents to meet for the first time over Chinese New Year reunion dinner. But as the boyfriend is estranged from his mother, he fakes a family to impress them instead.

The film was released on 20 January 2022 in Singapore and 31 January 2022 in Malaysia during the Chinese New Year period. The film stars Lawrence Wong, Cya Liu, Mark Lee, Xiang Yun, Guo Liang, Zhu Houren, Mimi Choo and Das DD.

It was one of the five 2022 Malaysian and Singaporean Chinese New Year films, including Ah Girls Go Army (Singapore), Nasi Lemak 1.0, Kongsi Raya and Small Town Heroes (Malaysia).

Synopsis 
A couple who works in an advertising firm, Chaoyang (Lawrence Wong) and Zihong (Cya Liu) have marriage on the cards, but both have not met the other’s parents. At a client's request, they have to do a livestream of their own reunion dinner to promote the company's products, their parents will officially meet for the first time.

Estranged with his mother Yanling (Xiang Yun) and embarrassed by her occupation as a mama-san, Chaoyang decides to fake a family with the help from his mother's boyfriend Wei (Mark Lee) and two freelance actors, who pretend to be his mother and "fake relatives", resulting in a series of mishaps and hilarity. With Zihong's father flying here from China, and a fake family assembled, can the reunion dinner go smoothly? Can Chaoyang fix the broken relationship with his mother?

Cast 
Lawrence Wong as Li Chaoyang
Cya Liu as Liu Zi Hong
Mark Lee as Wei, Yan Ling's boyfriend and part-time actor
Xiang Yun as Li Yanling, Chaoyang's estranged mother
Ferlyn G as young Yanling
Guo Liang as Liu Lanting, a Chinese war veteran and Zi Hong's father
Zhu Houren as Huang Hailong, Yanling's ex-boyfriend
Joel Choo as young Hailong
Mimi Choo as Zhang Ai Jia, a part-time actress hired to play Chaoyang's mother
Das DD (Dasa Dharamahsena) as AK, a part-time actor hired to play Chaoyang's cousin
Henry Thia as police officer
Tosh Zhang
Noah Yap
Maxi Lim

Release 
The film was directed by Singaporean director Ong Kuo Sin, his previous film is Number 1 (2020). Filming was completed in July 2021 in Singapore.

It starred China-based Singaporean actor Lawrence Wong and Chinese actress Cya Liu, and its cast includes well-known Singaporean actors and actress Mark Lee, Xiang Yun, Guo Liang, Zhu Houren, Hong Kong-based Malaysian veteran actress Mimi Choo and multilingual comedian Dasa DD, as well as special appearances by Ferlyn G, Joel Choo.

The film was released on 20 January 2022 in Singapore and 31 January 2022 in Malaysia during the Chinese New Year period. It was also released on iQIYI for the China market on 27 January 2022.

References

External links 

2022 films
Films shot in Singapore
Films set in Singapore
Films set in 2022
Singaporean romantic comedy films
Singaporean comedy-drama films